The 2010–11 Faysal Bank T20 Cup was the seventh edition of the domestic Faysal Bank T20 Cup in Pakistan, sponsored by Faysal Bank. This was one of the most closely fought tournaments in Pakistani Twenty20 cricket as the previous five tournaments had ended in victory for the Sialkot Stallions, this one saw the Stallions fall out in the first round. The Karachi Dolphins led by Shahid Afridi and Lahore Lions captained by Mohammad Yousuf competed in the final, which the Lahore Lions won by 37 runs. Abdul Razzaq was named man of the match for his valiant 78*.

The tournament was held from 10 to 16 October 2010 at Gaddafi Stadium, Lahore. 13 teams were divided into four groups. The topper from the each group qualified for the semi-finals. First semi-final was played between Islamabad Leopards and Lahore Lions while Karachi Dolphins and Rawalpindi Rams faced each other in the second semi-final. A total of 18 matches were played during the tournament including Final.

The Pakistan Cricket Board hoped that the success in the tournament would mean the return of international cricket to Pakistan. Safety measures in the tournament were conducted in an excellent fashion. No security breaches were recorded and no security breach occurred either. The safety report will be submitted to the ICC Despite being known for his poor fielding skills Mohammad Yousuf was named as fielder for the series International Wicket-keeper Adnan Akmal was named keeper of the series for his good batting and tidy keeping.

Despite the success of the tournament the Pakistan Cricket Board announced that a match between the Karachi Dolphins and Rawalpindi Rams (semi-final) was being investigated amid allegations of match-fixing. The board announced that another match was also under investigation.

Results

Teams and standings
The top team from each group qualified for the semi-finals. The top two teams of each group also qualified for the 2011 Faysal Bank Super Eight T20 Cup.

 Qualified for semifinals
Full table on ESPNCricinfo

Knockout stage

Fixtures

Knockout stage
Semi-finals

Final

Statistics

Most runs

Most wickets

Media coverage
 GEO Super (live) – Pakistan

References

External links
 Faysal Bank Twenty-20 Cup 2010/11 – ESPNCricinfo

Domestic cricket competitions in 2010–11
2010 in Pakistani cricket
2011 in Pakistani cricket
2010-11 National T20 Cup
Pakistani cricket seasons from 2000–01